Mulanthuruthy, also spelt Mulamthuruthy, is a  south-eastern suburb of the city of Kochi in Kerala, India. The historic Marthoman church is located here. Chottanikkara Temple is situated nearby Mulanthuruthy.

Location
It is about 15 km south-east of Kochi city centre and around 8 km east of Tripunithura. By road, Mulanthuruthy is accessible from Kanjiramattom (5 km) and from Piravom (13 km), Tripunithura and Ernakulam. Mulanthuruthy is situated on the banks of the Cochin Backwaters part of the Vembanad Lake. A minor distributary of the Muvattupuzha River passes through Mulanthuruthy.

Mulanthuruthy Railway Station is the local railhead. Cochin International Airport is the nearest airport.

Demographics
 India census, Mulamthuruthy had a population of 23615 with 11667 males and 11948 females.

References

External links

 Satellite map of Mulanthuruthy

Villages in Ernakulam district